Bagdadia is a genus of moths in the family Gelechiidae.

Species
 Bagdadia claviformis (Park, 1993)
 Bagdadia cymoptila (Meyrick, 1929)
 Bagdadia eucalla (Li & Zheng, 1998)
 Bagdadia gnomia (Ponomarenko, 1995)
 Bagdadia irakella Amsel, 1949
 Bagdadia isosema (Meyrick, 1921)
 Bagdadia khaoensis (Park & Ponomarenko, 1999)
 Bagdadia paroctas (Meyrick, 1913)
 Bagdadia salicicola (Park, 1995)
 Bagdadia salicicolella (Kuznetsov, 1960)
 Bagdadia sapindivora (Clarke, 1958)
 Bagdadia tricornis Yang & Li, 2015
 Bagdadia tugaella (Ponomarenko, 1995)
 Bagdadia yanglingensis (Li & Zheng, 1998)

References

 
Chelariini